Gentiana scabra, the Japanese gentian, is a species of flowering plant in the Gentian family (Gentianaceae), found in much of East Asia. The flowers bloom in mid-summer, autumn and are blue or dark blue in color.

Medicinal use
Gentiana scabra roots are used as a bitter tonic in Chinese herbalism where it is said to promote digestive secretions and treats a range of illnesses associated with the liver.

References

scabra
Flora of the United States
Flora of Japan
Taxa named by Alexander von Bunge